A teacher-librarian or school librarian or school library media specialist (SLMS) is a certified librarian who also has training in teaching.

According to the American Association of School Librarians (AASL), a division of the American Library Association (ALA), the official title for a certified librarian who works in a school in the United States is school librarian. In Australia, the term is teacher librarian.

Roles 
The teacher librarian performs four main leadership roles: teacher, instructional partner, information specialist, and program administrator. 

School librarians may read to children, assist them in selecting books, and assist with schoolwork. Some school librarians see classes on a "flexible schedule". A flexible schedule means that rather than having students come to the library for instruction at a fixed time every week, the classroom teacher schedules library time when the expertise of the school librarian, library and information skills, or materials are needed as part of a learning experience.

In the instructional partner role, school librarians collaborate with classroom teachers to create independent learners by fostering students' research, information literacy, technology, communication, and critical thinking skills. School librarians play a major role in infusing Information Literacy concepts and skills into secondary school curricula as well as enhances implementation of Information Literacy knowledge practices and dispositions into the secondary school education system.

As information specialists, school librarians develop a resource base for the school by using the curriculum and student interests to identify and obtain library materials. They also organize and maintain the library collection in order to promote independent reading and lifelong learning. Materials in the library collection can be located using an Online Public Access Catalog (OPAC).

This role also encompasses many activities relating to technology including the integration of resources in a variety of formats: periodical databases; Web sites; digital video segments; podcasts; blog and wiki content; digital images; virtual classrooms, etc.  School librarians are often responsible for audio-visual equipment and other technology used in the classroom. In some schools, they are also tasked as the technology specialist.   

As program administrators, school librarians define, lead, and manage school library media programs by establishing library policies; overseeing the library budget; planning the physical and virtual library space; and maintaining a welcoming, positive, and innovative learning atmosphere. Librarians also maintain the collection by adding items to enhance curriculum and entice readers in order to have good relationships with the patrons, both teachers and students. Many times, librarians are also responsible for repairing damaged books and periodicals.

Certification

Australia

There is a single pathway to becoming an accredited teacher librarian, eligible for associate membership of the Australian Library and Information Association. This is the Master of Education (Teacher Librarianship) course at Charles Sturt University, available for professionally-qualified teachers.

Nigeria
For someone to qualify as teacher-librarian in Nigeria you must possess any of the following:

 Diploma in Library and Information Science in addition to teacher training certificate (NCE, B.Ed, M.Ed.)
 Nigerian Certificate of Education(NCE), Library Science and other teaching subject
 Bachelor of Education Library Science and other teaching subject
 Bachelor of Library and Information Science (BLIS) in addition to teacher training certificate (NCE, B.Ed, M.Ed.)
 Masters of Library and Information Science (MLIS) in addition to teacher training certificate (NCE, B.Ed, M.Ed.)

However, teachers with certificate of attendance of teacher-librarian workshop can be put in charge of the school library where there is no qualified teacher-librarian.

United States
In the United States, there is no national qualification for school librarians. Instead, each state sets its own requirements. In many states a teacher-librarian must have a baccalaureate degree and a certificate in secondary or elementary education, and must also complete a school library media program and gain state certification. Programs in library science vary between institutions; however, state requirements must be met before a library media specialist is allowed to teach. Some school library media specialists hold the full Master of Library Science (MLS) or Master of Library and Information Science (MLIS) degree, while others do not.  In many instances, school librarians who have an MLS degree but do not have the requisite teaching credentials must obtain these teaching credentials and classroom teaching experience first before they are permitted to work as teacher-librarians. Often additional library science graduate coursework is required, focused specifically on issues pertaining to school librarianship.

Professional organizations
Teacher-librarians rely on the support of local, state, national, and international professional organizations for career and professional development, employment opportunities, and awards/grants/funding.  Groups like the International Association of School Librarianship; the American Association of School Librarians; the School Library Association in the United Kingdom and the Australian School Library Association host websites, publish journals, and sponsor conferences, workshops, and other events which showcase current research and practices in the field.

In the United States, teacher-librarians are also supported by state organizations which advocate for teachers at the district and school level. A comprehensive list is available from the ALA.

US legislation
In December 2015, school library programs fell under the benefits for the Every Student Succeeds Act, a law that opens the use of federal funding for school library programs.

See also
 School library
 :fr:Professeur documentaliste (in French)

References

External links 
 Teacher Librarian: The Journal for School Library Professionals

Education and training occupations
Library occupations
Library science